Columbia Township is one of ten townships in Gibson County, Indiana. As of the 2010 census, its population was 3,830 and it contained 1,757 housing units. Oakland City is the township seat.

Columbia Township was established in 1825.

Geography

Cities and towns
 Oakland City

Unincorporated towns
 Dongola
 Gray Junction
 Gudgel
 Oak Hill
(This list is based on USGS data and may include former settlements.)

Adjacent townships
Gibson County
 Barton Township (south)
 Center Township (west)
Pike County
 Logan Township (north)
 Patoka Township (east)
 Monroe Township (southeast)

Cemeteries
The township contains one cemetery, Montgomery.

Major highways

Education
Columbia Township is the center of the East Gibson School Corporation.

Primary and secondary schools
 Oakland City Elementary
 Waldo J. Wood Memorial Jr/Sr High School

Higher education
 Oakland City University - Main Campus

Public library
Columbia Township residents may request a free library card at the Oakland City-Columbia Township Public Library in Oakland City.

References
 
 United States Census Bureau cartographic boundary files

External links
 Indiana Township Association
 United Township Association of Indiana

Townships in Gibson County, Indiana
Townships in Indiana